Covington County School District may refer to:
 Covington County School District (Mississippi)
 Covington County Board of Education